King Arthur's messianic return is a mythological motif in the legend of King Arthur, which claims that he will one day return in the role of a messiah to save his people. It is an example of the king asleep in mountain motif. King Arthur was a legendary 6th-century British king. Few historical records of Arthur remain, and there are doubts that he ever existed, but he achieved a mythological stature that gave rise to a growing literature about his life and deeds.

Origins
The possibility of Arthur's return is first mentioned by William of Malmesbury in 1125: "But Arthur's grave is nowhere seen, whence antiquity of fables still claims that he will return." In the "Miracles of St. Mary of Laon" (De miraculis sanctae Mariae Laudunensis), written by a French cleric and chronicler named Hériman of Tournai in c. 1145, but referring to events that occurred in 1113, mention is made of the Breton and Cornish belief that Arthur still lived. As Constance Bullock-Davies demonstrated, various non-Welsh sources indicate that this belief in Arthur's eventual messianic return was extremely widespread amongst the Britons from the 12th century onwards. How much earlier than this it existed is still debated. It did, in fact, remain a powerful aspect of the Arthurian legend through the medieval period and beyond. So John Lydgate in his Fall of Princes (1431–38) notes the belief that Arthur "shall resorte as lord and sovereyne Out of fayrye and regne in Breteyne" and Philip II of Spain apparently swore, at the time of his marriage to Mary I of England in 1554, that he would resign the kingdom if Arthur should return.

A number of locations were suggested for where Arthur would actually return from. The earliest-recorded suggestion was Avalon. In his 12th-century Historia Regum Britanniae, Geoffrey of Monmouth asserted that Arthur "was mortally wounded" at Camlann but was then carried "to the Isle of Avallon (insulam Auallonis) to be cured of his wounds", with the implication that he would at some point be cured and return therefrom made explicit in Geoffrey's later Vita Merlini. Another tradition held that Arthur was awaiting his return beneath some mountain or hill. First referenced by Gervase of Tilbury in his Otia Imperialia (c.1211), this was maintained in British folklore into the 19th century and R.S. Loomis and others have taken it as a tale of Arthur's residence in an underground (as opposed to an overseas) Otherworld. Other less common concepts include the idea that Arthur was absent leading the Wild Hunt, or that he had been turned into a crow or raven.

Influence

Medieval politics
The influence of Arthur's legend is not confined to novels, stories, and films; the legend of Arthur's messianic return has often been politically influential. On the one hand, it seems to have provided a means of rallying Welsh resistance to Anglo-Norman incursions in the 12th century and later. The Anglo-Norman text Description of England recounts of the Welsh that "openly they go about saying,... / that in the end, they will have it all; / by means of Arthur, they will have it back... / They will call it Britain again." It may be that such references as this reflect a Welsh belief that Arthur ought to be associated with the "Mab Darogan" ("Son of Prophecy"), a messianic figure of the Welsh prophetic tradition who would repel the enemies of the Welsh and who was often identified with heroes such as Cadwaladr, Owain Lawgoch and Owain Glyndŵr in Welsh prophetic verse. However, as Oliver Padel has noted, no example of a Welsh prophetic poetry telling of Arthur's return to expel the enemies of the Welsh from Britain has survived, which some have seen as troubling and a reason for caution: we must rely on non-Welsh texts (such as the above) for the notion that this was a widespread belief amongst the Welsh from the mid-12th century onwards, along with more debatable evidence such as Henry VII's attempts to associate himself with Arthur when taking the throne, discussed below. 

On the other hand, the notion of Arthur's eventual return to rule a united Britain was adopted by the Plantagenet kings to justify their rule. Once King Arthur had been safely pronounced dead, in an attempt to deflate Welsh dreams of a genuine Arthurian return, the Plantagenets were then able to make ever greater use of Arthur as a political cult to support their dynasty and its ambitions. So, Richard I used his status as the inheritor of Arthur's realm to shore up foreign alliances, giving a sword reputed to be Excalibur to Tancred of Sicily. Similarly, "Round Tables"—jousting and dancing in imitation of Arthur and his knights—occurred at least eight times in England between 1242 and 1345, including one held by Edward I in 1284 to celebrate his conquest of Wales and consequent "reunification" of Arthurian Britain. The Galfridian claim that Arthur conquered Scotland was also used by Edward I to provide legitimacy to his claims of English suzerainty over that region.

Post-medieval politics
The influence of King Arthur on the political machinations of England's kings was not confined to the medieval period: the Tudors also found it expedient to make use of Arthur. In 1485, Henry VII marched through Wales to take the English throne under the banner of the Arthurian Red Dragon, he commissioned genealogies to show his putative descent from Arthur, and named his first-born son Arthur. Later, in the reigns of Henry VIII and Elizabeth, Arthur's career was influential once again, now in providing evidence for supposed historical rights and territories in legal cases that pursued the crown's interests.

Whilst the potential for such political usage—wherein the reality of Geoffrey's Arthur and his wide-ranging conquests was accepted and proclaimed by English antiquarians and thus utilized by the crown—naturally declined after the attacks on Geoffrey's Historia by Polydore Vergil and others, Arthur has remained an occasionally politically potent figure through to the present era. In the 20th century, a comparison of John F. Kennedy and his White House with Arthur and Camelot, made by Kennedy's widow, helped consolidate Kennedy's posthumous reputation, with Kennedy even becoming associated with an Arthur-like messianic return in American folklore.

Modern adaptations
This idea of Arthur's eventual return has proven attractive to a number of modern writers. John Masefield used the idea of Arthur sleeping under a hill as the central theme in his poem Midsummer Night (1928). C. S. Lewis was also inspired by this aspect of Arthur's legend in his novel That Hideous Strength (1945), in which King Arthur is said to be living in the land of Abhalljin on the planet Venus.  

The return of King Arthur has been especially prominent in the comics medium with examples from at least the 1940s. One of the better-known uses of this motif is by Mike Barr and Brian Bolland, who has Arthur and his knights returning in the year 3000 to save the Earth from an alien invasion in the comic book series Camelot 3000 (1982–85). Other examples include Stephen R. Lawhead's novel Avalon: The Return of King Arthur (1999), featuring a reincarnated Arthur who rises to restore the British monarchy as it is about to be abolished. In Vinland Saga, a manga on the Viking invasion and rule of England, the character Askeladd, a Norwegian-Welsh half-blood, recounts the tale of his true king and ancestor, Lucius Artorius Castus, and his glorious return from Avalon to save Britannia.

See also
Bhagavad Gita
Constantine XI Palaiologos
Epic of King Gesar
Muhammad al-Mahdi
Nero Redivivus legend
Ogier the Dane
Rudra Chakrin

References

Arthurian legend
King asleep in mountain
Political history of medieval England